Walser German and Walliser German (locally ) are a group of Highest Alemannic dialects spoken in parts of Switzerland (Valais, Ticino, Grisons), Italy (Piedmont, Aosta Valley), Liechtenstein (Triesenberg, Planken), and Austria (Vorarlberg).

Usage of the terms Walser and Walliser has come to reflect a difference of geography, rather than language. The term Walser refers to those speakers whose ancestors migrated into other Alpine valleys in medieval times, whereas Walliser refers only to a speaker from Upper Valais – that is, the upper Rhone valley. In a series of migrations during the Late Middle Ages, people migrated out of the Upper Valais, across the higher valleys of the Alps.

History

The Alemannic immigration to the Rhone valley started in the 8th century.  There were presumably two different immigration routes, from what is now the Bernese Oberland, that led to two main groups of Walliser dialects.  
In the 12th or 13th century, the Walliser began to settle other parts of the Alps. These new settlements are known as Walser migration. In many of these settlements, people still speak Walser.

Because the people who speak Walser German live in the isolated valleys of the high mountains, Walser German has preserved certain archaisms retained from Old High German which were lost in other variants of German. The dialect of the Lötschental, for instance, preserved three distinct classes of weak verbs until the beginning of the 20th century.

Walser German dialects are considered endangered, and language shift to the majority language (French, Italian, Standard German) has taken place in the course of the later 20th century.

Classification

Walser German is part of the Highest Alemannic group, most closely related to dialects spoken in the Bernese Oberland and in Central Switzerland (Uri, Schwyz, Unterwalden, Glarus).

There is limited mutual intelligibility with High Alemannic forms of Swiss German  (whose speakers are called  "outer Swiss" by the Walliser), and barely any mutual intelligibility with Standard German.

Distribution and dialects
The total number of speakers in the world estimated at 22,000 speakers (as of 2004), of whom about 10,000 are in Switzerland.
Because the dialect group is quite spread out, there is rarely any contact between the dialects. Therefore, the dialects that compose Walser German are very different from each other as well. 
Specific Walser dialects can be traced to eastern or western dialects of the Upper Valais. Conservative Walser dialects are more similar to the respective groups of Wallis dialects than to neighboring Walser dialects.

Valais: Simplon, Gondo (Zwischbergen)
valleys in the Monte Rosa massif:
Aosta Valley: Gressoney-La-Trinité, Gressoney-Saint-Jean, Issime, historically in upper Ayas Valley and in Champdepraz.
 province of Vercelli: Alagna Valsesia, Alto Sermenza, Rimella, Riva Valdobbia
 province of Verbano-Cusio-Ossola: Formazza, Macugnaga, Ornavasso, Agaro and Salecchio (frazioni of Premia), Ausone, Campello Monti (frazione of Valstrona)
Bernese Oberland: Lauterbrunnen, Mürren, Planalp
Canton of Grisons: Rheinwald, Obersaxen, Vals GR, Signina (Gemeinde Riein, Safiental, Tenna, Valendas, Versam, Tschappina, Avers, Mutten, Schanfigg, upper Landwassertal, Davos, Prättigau
Liechtenstein (probably settled from Prättigau): Triesenberg, Planken
Canton of Ticino: Bosco/Gurin
Canton of St. Gall: Calfeisental, Taminatal
Vorarlberg and Tirol: Großes Walsertal, Kleines Walsertal; Tannberg, Schröcken, Lech and Warth, parts of Steeg in Tirol, Galtür and Ischgl in the Paznauntal, Brand, Bürserberg, Dünserberg, Ebnit, Laternsertal, Damüls, Silbertal
Allgäu: Kleinwalsertal

Phonology 
Because the dialects of Walser German are different from each other, it is difficult to make generalizations about the language that apply to all the dialects. This section will be about the Walser German dialect of Formazza, or Pomattertitsch. Pomattertitsch is part of the Highest Alemannic German dialect group, which is made up of dialects that share similar features. The Highest Alemannic German group contains German dialects of Valais; Walser German dialects in Italy and Ticino; and eastern Walser German dialects in Grisons, Vorarlberg, and Liechtenstein. The first feature that is shared by this group is the palatalization of Middle High German (MHG) -s- to -sch-. This is very typical of Walser German dialects in general. For Pomattertitsch, however, this does not apply to every word that contains -s-:  'son',  'sun', and  'to be'. The second feature is a change from -nk- to -ch- or -h-: German  to Pomattertitsch  'think', German  to Pomattertitsch  'drink'. The final feature is the lack of diphthongs where they are present in German words: German  to Pomattertitsch  'build', German  to Pomattertitsch  'snow'.

Morphology 
Again, this section will be about the Walser German dialect Pomattertitsch.

Nouns 
Pomattertitsch marks number (singular and plural) and gender (masculine, feminine, neuter) on nouns, like most dialects of German. It also marks case (nominative/accusative, genitive, dative) on nouns, although it has been reduced over time. It also distinguishes between strong and weak nouns.

Table 1 Nouns:

Pomattertitsch has definite (English 'the') and indefinite (English 'a') articles that agree in case, number, and gender with the noun:

Table 2 Definite Articles:

Table 3 Indefinite Articles:

Adjectives also agree in number, and gender with the noun it is modifying in Pomattertitsch. For adjectives in the attributive position, there is also agreement in strong versus weak nouns, and in case.

Table 4 Strong Attributive 'tired':

Table 5 Weak Attributive 'tired':

Table 6 Predicative 'tired':

In Pomattertitsch, there is a distinction between impersonal and personal pronouns. The personal pronouns agree in number and case, with third person agreeing in gender as well for singular pronouns only.

Table 7 Personal Pronouns:

Verbs 
The verbs in Pomattertitsch can be categorized into one of four classes depending on their past participle and infinitive endings:
 Strong verbs: infinitive ending in -ä, past participle ending in -ä. Examples:  'close',  'throw',  'milk'.
 Weak verbs, Old High German -jan, -en: infinitive ending in -ä, past participle ending in -t. Examples:  'speak',  'live'.
 Weak verbs, Old High German -on: infinitive ending in -u, past participle ending in -(u)t. Examples:  'make',  'listen',  'paint'.
 Weak verbs derived from Italian: infinitive ending in -ire, past participle ending in -irt. Examples:  'think',  'study'.
The two classes that are most productive are three and four. The third class is most productive in deriving verbs from nouns, and the fourth class is most productive in deriving loan-words from Italian.

Table 8 Verb Conjugations in Present Indicative of 'Normal Verbs':

Table 9 Verb Conjugations in Present Indicative of 'Special Verbs':

In Pomattertitsch, a 'dummy' auxiliary  'do' followed by the infinitive form of a verb is common for the present indicative, subjunctive, and imperative. This insertion has the same meaning as if the verb was to be conjugated normally:  'I do speak/I speak'.

There is not a preterite form in Pomattertitsch. Instead, past tense is expressed using the present perfect, which is formed with auxiliaries 'to be' and 'to have' followed by the past participle. On the other hand, the future tense is expressed morphologically by adding the particle  at the end of an inflected verb and after enclitic pronouns, if there are any in the sentence.

The passive is expressed in Pomattertitsch by using the auxiliary  'come' followed by the past participle of the verb, which agrees in gender and number with the subject of the sentence:  'salami is eaten raw'. The causative is expressed using  'do' followed by the agent of the caused event, then the preposition z (separate word, not morpheme), and then the infinitive:  'and he makes the girl eat'. The imperative is expressed most commonly by using  'do' plus the infinitive, as stated above:  'do ask, ask!'. Another way is the bare indicative stem for the singular form, and the same present indicative form for the plural:  'speak German, you!' and  'come (pl) here!'.

There are two different subjunctive forms used in Pomattertitsch. The first form is used mainly in reported speech and in subordinate clauses that follow 'say' or 'think'. It also occurs in complement clauses that follow  'that'. The second form is used for the conditional mood, where the conjunction  'if' can be omitted without changing the meaning of the sentence.

Table 10 Subjunctive 1:

Table 11 Subjunctive 2:

Syntax 
The Walser German dialect group has the same word order as German, for the most part. For some dialects, however, there is a change occurring in the word order of verbal brace constructions. In German, the finite verb occurs in the second position, and the non-finite verb occurs in the final position:

Peter has just now the ball into the goal thrown

'Peter threw the ball into the goal just now'

In some dialects, specifically Gressoney, Formazza, and Rimella, the finite and non-finite verbs occur right next to each other, with the complements and adverbials at the end of the sentence. An example of this in Rimella is given below:

the father and the mother have made the cross to the child

'The father and mother made a cross for the child'

This is a change from SOV (subject, object, verb) to SVO word order. This change is due to the increasing influence of Italian on Walser German. However, the SOV word order is still used when there is negation and when there is an inverted subject.

Some southern dialects of Walser German are starting to omit the subject pronoun of sentences, just having the inflection on the verb to indicate what the subject is. This phenomenon is known as pro-dropping, and is common among languages. Italian is a pro-drop language, and German is not, which means that Italian is influencing some southern dialects of Walser German.

Example 

An example of "" from Issime - Éischeme, Aosta Valley, Italy:

«»

English rough translation:

"My grandfather came from Gaby, my grandmother from Issime, from hamlet Praz. Stévenin was the father, the grandmother came from the Chémonal family. [...] The pasture [in the Bourines Valley] probably belonged to my grandfather. I don't know whether he was from my father's side. It belonged to my family, they had a beautiful house in Gaby. Victor, my father, was from his lineage, his father, my grandfather, came from over there... Victor le gabençois. Later he had a son, to whom he gave his name, so that my father's name was Victor too. He then got married when he was 56, and he had four sisters, two of them got married and two did not. They always worked and lived with him. Later one of them died."

See also 
Germanic languages

References

External links
 Google Map of Walser Settlements 1200 to Present
 The Bosco Gurin dialect 

German dialects
Alemannic German language
Swiss German language
Languages of Piedmont
Languages of Austria
Languages of Liechtenstein
Languages of France
Languages of Italy